Republic Airways Holdings, Inc. is an American airline holding corporation based in Indianapolis, Indiana, that owns Republic Airways, an American regional airline operating in the United States, and LIFT Academy, the only flight training academy owned by an airline in the United States.

Republic Airways operates a fleet of Embraer 170 and Embraer 175 aircraft.

History

Forming the holding company
The company traces its roots to Chautauqua Airlines, founded in 1973 in Jamestown, New York, by Joel and Gloria Hall. Joel had been a pilot for Mohawk Airlines. Chautauqua was one of the first airlines to fly under code shares, initially with Allegheny Airlines which later became USAirways.

In 1988, an affiliate of Guarantee Security Life Insurance Company bought the airline. Three years later, the Florida Department of Insurance took over the insurance company and its airline subsidiary after the insurance company was declared insolvent.

In 1994, Chautauqua swapped routes with Jetstream International which had been owned by USAir. Chautauqua then moved its headquarters to Indianapolis.

In 1998, the company formally organized as a holding company, with Chautauqua as its only subsidiary. The holding company capitalized on the name Republic from Republic Airlines of the 1980s because it had better national recognition than Chautauqua. However, the earlier Republic Airlines has no historic ties to the new company other than the name.

Wexford Management of Greenwich, Connecticut, an investment company, bought the holding company on May 15, 1998. Wexford had already owned National Airlines and was also invested heavily in Midway Airlines. Wexford’s interest in distressed airline firms dates back to 1995 when the assets of MarkAir were purchased in a bankruptcy auction.

Republic Airways Holdings incorporated a new subsidiary, "Republic Airline, Inc." (sic), in 1999, but the subsidiary was left as a "shell" company until 2004.

On May 26, 2004, an IPO was launched on NASDAQ under the ticker symbol RJET with Wexford Capital remaining the majority shareholder.

Bankruptcy
On February 25, 2016, Republic Airways Holdings Inc filed for bankruptcy protection because of plunging profits, a pilot shortage, and a loss of revenue during the past several quarters associated with grounding aircraft.

Republic Airways Holdings Inc., announced that it had emerged from bankruptcy protection on April 30, 2017.

Scope clauses
In 2004, the holding company activated Republic Airline in reaction to a pilots' suit against American Airlines. American had awarded the flying of 44-seat regional jets to Chautauqua, then the main operating subsidiary of Republic Airways Holdings. However, Chautauqua later started to operate 70-seat regional jets on behalf of another major airline, and this caused American to be in violation of its pilot union scope clause, which prevented another airline from operating on behalf of American if that airline was operating jet aircraft of more than 50 seats, even if such aircraft were operating on behalf of a carrier other than American. To repair the situation, Republic Airways Holdings activated Republic Airline, and upon Part 121 certification in 2005  allowing Republic Airways to operate commercial service. Republic Airways Holdings then transferred the offending 70-seat regional jets from Chautauqua to Republic Airlines. American was thereby no longer in violation of its pilot union scope clause. Republic Airways Holdings paid US$6.6 million to the Allied Pilots Association to settle the issue.

To sidestep yet another scope clause issue in 2005, Republic Airways Holdings bought Shuttle America from Wexford affiliate Shuttle Acquisition LLC. To avoid further liability, all Embraer 170 aircraft were transferred to Shuttle America, which previously only operated Saab 340 turboprops. Subsequently, American Airlines and its pilots changed the scope agreement as part of the bankruptcy and merger with US Airways to allow more regional airlines, other than wholly owned American Airlines subsidiary American Eagle (now Envoy Air), to fly larger regional airliners under the American Eagle brand. Republic Airlines began flying the first of 47 Embraer 175 aircraft under the American Eagle brand in July 2013.

Further acquisitions
In September 2005, Republic purchased 113 slots at Ronald Reagan Washington National Airport, 24 slots at LaGuardia Airport, and ten Embraer 170 aircraft from US Airways with an agreement to lease those assets back to US Airways. The deal was necessary for US Airways to emerge from bankruptcy protection.

In July 2009, Republic acquired 89 percent of Mokulele Airlines and financially troubled Midwest Airlines. In October 2009, the company acquired Frontier Airlines which was being reorganized along with Frontier Airlines Holdings' Lynx Aviation in Chapter 11 bankruptcy. On April 13, 2010, Republic announced that Midwest and Frontier would combine into a single airline, keeping the Frontier Airlines name.

On October 23, 2009, Republic announced a joint venture with Mesa Air Group in which Embraer E170 routes operated by Shuttle America were transitioned to smaller Bombardier CRJ200 regional jet aircraft provided by Mesa Airlines.

In the fourth quarter of 2011, Republic announced that it would spin off Frontier as a separate company. On December 2, 2013, Frontier was sold in its entirety to an affiliate of Indigo Partners. As part of the agreement, Republic Airlines removed the remaining Frontier branded Embraer 190 jets in "pro-rated" service with Frontier Airlines.

On July 28, 2014, Republic Airways Holdings announced that Chautauqua Airlines would be absorbed into Shuttle America "by year-end" to reduce costs. Chautauqua's only remaining aircraft, 41 ERJ-145s, would be transferred to the Shuttle America operating certificate. This would leave only two subsidiaries, Republic Airlines and Shuttle America, flying under Republic Airways Holdings.

In 2015, it was announced that Republic Airways Holdings would begin to merge existing subsidiaries Shuttle America and Republic Airlines, with the merger completed by January 31, 2017. As 2015 ended, subsidiary Shuttle America began to transfer aircraft, flight attendants, and pilots over to the Republic Airways certificate. As part of the merger process, Republic Airways Holdings also announced that it would be seeking a single aircraft type, and began to phase out the E-145 aircraft from the Shuttle Certificate with the final flight taking place on September 30, 2016. Additionally, Republic Airways Holdings also announced it would begin to phase out the Q-400 flying on the Republic Airlines certificate. The final Q-400 flight took place on March 31, 2016.

After minor delays, Republic Airline and Shuttle America completed the merger process on the morning of January 31, 2017. At that time, all Shuttle America aircraft and employees began operating under the Republic Airline certificate, and parent company Republic Airways Holdings surrendered the Shuttle America Certificate back to the FAA.

Subsidiary timeline

Codeshare agreements
Following is a breakdown of traffic upon all Republic Airways Holdings airlines as of April 18, 2017.

Fleet overview
As of January 2017, Republic Airways Holdings, through its subsidiary Republic Airways, operates 185 regional aircraft.

In February 2010, Republic Airways Holdings became the first North American customer for the Bombardier CSeries regional jet. In 2014, following delays in the CS300 program, Republic expressed doubts in keeping their CS300 order, but announcement that a final decision would be put off. In September 2014 Republic confirmed that their order for 40 Cseries aircraft was still in place, despite ongoing technical issues. As part of the 2016 bankruptcy proceedings, an agreement was reached with Bombardier to amend the order for its CSeries aircraft by deferring payments and deliveries.

On September 17, 2014, Republic Airways Holdings announced it would stop flying Bombardier Q400 turboprops in 2016.  The last Q400 was retired in March 2016. On September 30th, 2016, the Embraer 145 fleet was retired.

On December 1, 2016, all remaining aircraft operating under the Shuttle America certificate were to be transferred to Republic Airlines as Shuttle America ceased operations as part of the final step in the merger process; the merger was completed on January 31, 2017.

As of January 31, 2017, Republic Airways Holdings, through its subsidiary Republic Airways, operates the largest fleet of Embraer 170 and Embraer 175 aircraft in the world.

On August 8, 2019, it was reported that Republic Airways Holdings appeared to have cancelled the order for 40 Airbus A220-300s long-held by the company, as it is no longer featured as a customer for Airbus according to its latest backlog figures. It had originally ordered the jets in 2010, when they were still known as Bombardier CS300s.

References

External links
 Republic Airways Holdings

Airline holding companies of the United States
Companies based in Indianapolis
 
Regional airlines of the United States
Companies that filed for Chapter 11 bankruptcy in 2016
Companies formerly listed on the Nasdaq
Airlines based in Indiana